Skittles is a historical lawn game and target sport of European origin, from which the modern sport of nine-pin bowling is descended. In regions of the United Kingdom and Ireland the game remains as a popular indoor pub game.

Playing 

Skittles is usually played indoors on a bowling alley, with one or more heavy balls, usually spherical but sometimes oblate, and several (most commonly nine) , or small bowling pins. The general object of the game is to use the ball(s) to knock over the skittles, either specific ones or all of them, depending upon game variant. Exact rules vary widely on a regional basis.

Rules variations
(Note:  See Glossary below for explanation of named pins)

Front pin first
In this variant of the game, pins are counted only if the front pin is knocked over first. If the front pin is missed, any pins that are knocked over are not reset. In Devon Summer League, this rule is played frequently. In Bristol, this is the form of the game played and "all in" skittles tends to be looked down upon as involving less skill. In Worcestershire, this type of game is also known as "king pin".

Nomination
In this variant of the game, the player has to nominate the pin that will be hit first before the throw. Unless this pin is knocked over, the player will not score. The names given to the pins may vary from region to region; in Wiltshire they are usually referred to as "front pin", "front right quarter", "front left quarter", "outside right" (or "right winger"), "centre pin", "outside left" (or "left winger"), "back right quarter", "back left quarter", and "back pin".

Four-pins
In this variant of the game, only four pins (the two coppers and the front and back pins) are put up and must be hit with the front pin first. It is often used in conjunction with nomination as well. It is currently used in North Somerset Cup games.

London Bridge
A variant of nomination but with only the landlord and two coppers set up, i.e. one has to hit a pin with each ball and nominate which one each time.

Killer, Coffins, or German skittles
A game for any number of people. Each starts with three lives. Each bowls only one ball at a time. The first bowls at a full frame and the skittles are not stuck up until all nine are hit down. Each time a player fails to hit at least one pin, they lose a life. The winner is the last one left with a life intact. Usually played for small amounts of money, the winner takes the combined player entry fees (typically £1 or 50p per game each). It is found in the Wiltshire, Somerset, and Bristol areas. Players might claim a "tactical miss" when they have multiple lives remaining and fail to hit the only pin still standing. This is to avoid giving the following player a full frame.

Six-ball Westbury
Another game for any number of people. Each player has one hand of six balls at a full frame. If all nine pins are knocked down within the hand, then they are reset, meaning that a player may score anywhere between 0 and 54. The winner is the player with the highest score. It is similar to killer in that it is usually played for money with the winner taking the pot.

Regional variations

Greater London
Also known as Old English Skittles, the Greater London version uses nine pins (made of wood) and a thick circular disc known as a 'cheese'. The cheese is thrown at the pins using a swinging motion whilst stepping forwards. After an initial throw, the remaining pins (the 'broken frame') may end up in a variety of formations - each of which has a distinctive (and usually London-based) name, such as a London Bridge or a Portsmouth Road. Knocking down all the pins at once is known as a 'floorer' and is highly respected. The last time a player is known to have thrown three floorers in succession was in 1960.

While it was once a popular game played in pubs all over London (generally sited by the Thames river), it is now only played at the Freemasons Arms in Hampstead. The origins of this skittles game are vague, but it is thought by some to have been started by Dutch sailors, possibly playing on the decks of moored barges.

A game of Greater London skittles can be seen played in the film The Water Gipsies (film).

Guernsey
In the Sarnia Skittles League of Guernsey, the teams are made up of six players playing five legs of three balls. Currently there are 25 teams playing across three leagues and each Team plays the others three times during the season. The season runs from September to April.

Gloucestershire
In the Tewkesbury and District Skittles League, teams consist of 10 players playing 8 hands each. The league runs from early September through to the following April. The league was formed in September 1960. Each game has 10 points available with two points available for the first, second and third leg with another four for the match result. The highest ever individual score is 99 scored by Dougy for the DM4s team at the Spartans caldron 17 April 2014.

In the Stroud and District Skittle League, teams are made up of 10 players (Men's Sections) each having eight hands of three balls. In the Ladies Sections each team consists of eight players each having 10 hands of three balls. Games are played in two equal halves. The league runs from early September through to the following May.

In the Cheltenham Skittles League, skittles is played with either a team of 12 (winter skittles) or six (summer skittles). Each player plays six hands of three balls. However, in Gloucester, the players play 10 hands of three balls, and a team is made up of 10 players.

The Berkeley and District Skittles League was formed in 1957 and has in excess of 100 teams playing in seven divisions in a geographical area of around eight miles in diameter in the southern end of the county. Teams are made up of eight players and each player bowls eight hands of three balls. The League runs from September through to the following April.

In the Cirencester & District Men's Skittle League, teams are made up of nine players each having six hands of three balls. The league runs from early September through to the following May

Herefordshire
In the Hereford & District Invitation Skittle League, skittles is played with either a team of 12 (winter skittles) or 6 (summer skittles). In the Winter league each player plays four hands of three balls, and in the Summer League they play six hands of three balls.

The winter league comprises 70 teams competing in five divisions, five cups competitions (KO, Front Pin, Man v Man, Champion of Champions, and Charity eight-a-side) and also singles and pairs competitions.

Wiltshire
In the Devizes Skittles League, 9-pin skittles is played with a team of 9 players. Each player throws 3 balls. A team's aggregate score decides the leg - 2 points are awarded for each leg won (1 point each for a draw). Two points for the overall aggregate number of pins, for a total of 10 points available for the match. The team with the most points wins the match. The league runs from August to April. There are approximately 40 teams across 4 divisions, playing within a 5-mile radius of Devizes. The top division plays front-pin rules whereby only pins knocked down after the front pin count.

In the Westbury Town Mid-Week Skittles League, teams consist of 8 players, games consist of 5 legs, and players throws 3 balls per leg. Points are awarded to the winning team by aggregate score; 1 point per leg (1/2 for a draw) and 2 points for the game (1 for a draw) for a total of 7 points per game. As of the 2019/20 season (called off due to Covid-19) there were 43 teams across 3 divisions (none currently playing front-pin rules). The league also hosts Singles, Pairs, Nomination, and Knock Out Cup competitions (all decided by game aggregate score).

The Malmesbury and District League is played with nine players per team, divided into three legs. Each player has six goes with three balls. Two points are awarded for each winning leg, and a further four points are awarded to the overall winning team, so ten points are available per game. Games typically last around 1 hour 40 minutes and are played Tuesday to Friday. This is one of the larger leagues in the area with 95 teams playing on 20 different alleys within a ten-mile radius of Malmesbury Abbey. The league begins in September and concludes in April, although various cup matches occur in August and April.

The Swindon & District Friday Skittles League is played with twelve players per team, divided into four legs; hence, each is called a 'Horse' (because a horse has four legs). Points are awarded thus - 2 points per Horse, plus 6 points for winning. There are currently 36 teams in three sections. The league runs from September to June. There are Cup Knockout Competitions throughout the season.

Somerset and Bristol
The rules and team formats of "Somerset" skittles vary. Major skittles areas include Bridgwater, Wells, Yeovil, Taunton, Weston-super-Mare, and Burnham-on-Sea. Bristol is also included in the "Somerset" skittles "set". Depending on where the leagues play, there may be 6 players per side (normally in summer leagues), or 8 per side (winter). There are mixed leagues (males and females in each team) and there are all male leagues and all female leagues. The highest known score in a game of 8 man skittles was in the Street and District league, this was by Ryan Church for the Carrot Crunchers. He scored 97 in 6 hands including two 26 spares.

Traditionally, Somerset skittles uses wooden balls (made from apple wood or similar) and wooden pins. Times have changed and for various reasons, some alleys now use composite rubber balls and nylon pins.

In North Somerset, teams are of 12 (winter leagues) and 9 (summer leagues). Players may be organised in sets of 3 or 4 (teams of 12 only).

Bristol and North Somerset alleys have, in the past been known for their "camber". Some alleys were (and still are) raised in the middle, making bowling an accurate art.

Worcestershire

Worcestershire Rules Variations

The Alley, Pin diamond, Pins and Balls
As with all variations of skittles the pins are laid out in a diamond and played on an alley, with the pins placed on painted squares known as plates.

The pins and balls are known as the 'Kit' and the balls should be made of wood, Tufnol or rubber and 'must not exceed five and a quarter inches in diameter and no less than four and three quarter inches in diameter'. Despite guidelines for the diamond and balls there is no uniform size of pin needing only 'to be uniform size and painted white, one and a half inches around the top.

The Alley itself should be 'clean and well lit, with a bowling line approximately 33 ft to the front pin of the diamond'. However this rule is not strictly enforced with some alleys being shorter than others. The Alley itself can be either Lino or Wood.

The front pin is known as the 'King' and is painted with a white, one and a half inch wide vertical stripe. The two pins to either side are known as the 'Quarter pins' and are marked with either a triangle or the numbers 1 and 2, in order to identify them. Traditionally the 'King' is the heaviest pin, with the 'Quarters' being heavier than the rest of the pins but not heavier than the 'King'. Directly behind the 'King' is the middle pin which is known as the 'Birdie', as the other pins form a 'cage' around it. The back pin sits directly behind the 'Birdie', the 'Back quarters' directly behind the 'Quarter' pins, and the 'Wingers' on the outside of the diamond. The 'Birdie', 'Back Quarters', 'Back Pin' and 'Wingers' are non-specific pins and are not marked so any of the six unmarked pins can be placed on any of the six plates.

Because of the lack of guidelines on pin size, the pins themselves vary in size. this leads to some 'Kits' being higher scoring than others and some alleys being higher scoring than others, due to variations in length and diamond size

Scoring pins
All balls must touch the Alley before the 'Line' to be deemed as legal. However the 'Linesman' (a member of the opposing team who sits and watches the line) must call 'Over' before the ball strikes a pin. If they fail to do this, the pins felled will count.
In Worcester skittles all pins are live until they land in the pit behind the diamond, or leave the alley on an open side. They can rebound off a side wall back into the diamond taking down other pin(s). In some alleys, such as the Saracens Head in Worcester, the Diamond is flanked by two side walls making the possibility of a spare, achieved by bouncing pins off the wall more of a possibility. It is more than common to hear the cries of 'let it roll' go out in the alleys of the city to stop an over enthusiastic 'sticker up' (a young person employed to put the pins back up after they have been knocked down) removing a pin from the alley before it has finished knocking down the others. However, if a ball hits the cush, or wall or passes through the diamond and bounces back out of the pit before felling pins the frame must be reset.

Spiders and Spares
A Player scoring no pins after bowling three balls in the leg is known as scoring a 'Spider'. A spider is recorded by drawing legs and a face onto the zero on the board and is greeted with delight when the opposing team returns to the alley. A 'Spare' where the pins are reset after being felled with balls to spare is denoted on the board by a circle drawn around the score. This is not greeted so favourably. The maximum score in a 9-pin frame is 27, however this is virtually unheard of, the highest spare in the history of the Worcester and District was thought to be a 24 scored by Gary Sandbrook whilst playing for the Independents Skittle team in the early 1990s, the highest spare in the friendly league was achieved by Scott Heywood with a full house score of 27 at the Alma tavern whilst playing for the Rushwick Cavalier on 18 September 2014. Spares are not uncommon however, and a good score in the Worcester game is 40 plus.

Worcester and District Skittle League
The Worcester and District Skittle League, 12 players, playing 5 legs of 3 ball (winter league, men only, Tuesday nights) is the oldest skittle league running in the county, having been restarted post-war in 1946, and is a founder member of the Three cities Association. The Worcester and District is the county representative in the Three City Cup competition, played between Worcestershire, Gloucestershire and Herefordshire between September and May each season.

The rivalry between the District and the younger Friendly leagues (WFSL) in Worcester has always been great; however, in season 2004/05 it was decided by the District League that players signed on for a team registered for their competition were free to play for a team affiliated with the WFSL. Up to that point playing for a team in the WFSL while being signed on to a team affiliated with the Worcester and District would lead to a lifetime ban from the District League.

Until the end of season 2009/10 the scoring system was different for both leagues, with the Worcester and District League opting for the traditional 2 points for a win and 1 for a draw, and the WFSL opting for a system which awards 2 points for winning a leg and 10 points for the game, a total of twenty points. However at the start of season 2010/11 the same scoring system as the WFSL was adopted by the Worcester and District in order to increase the competitive nature of the League and hopefully stem the declining interest in the sport. In recent years, the popularity of Skittles has declined with the District League and WFSL both having to reduce the number of divisions from 5 down to 3.

District Cup Competitions
The District League compete for a number of cup competitions, with matches taking place on both Tuesday and Friday evenings. The premier cup competition being the Team Knock Out, but also the King Pin Cup (a variation in the rules applied so the front pin, or King pin as its known in Worcester has to be knocked over before scoring can commence) and the Mick Potter Memorial Trophy. There are also Singles (solo players) and Doubles (Teams of two) as well as a Six a side Trophy held each year.

The County Cup
The County Cup is played between the representative sides of the WFSL, Worcester and District, Worcester Ladies, Malvern Men's League and the Malvern Ladies League. It is played on a Round Robin basis, with ten fixture dates (to include one bye), a play off, and a final. The Evesham League is not included, possibly due to too many rule variations (player v player format, mixed teams).

Worcester Friendly Skittle League (WFSL)
In the Worcester Friendly Skittle League (WFSL) of Worcestershire, both the men's and ladies' winter leagues are made up of 12 players. Men's Matches are played on Monday and Wednesday Nights and Ladies on Thursdays.

Malvern Men's Skittle league
Malvern Men's Skittle League has been running for over 35 years within the Malvern area. This includes Great Malvern, Malvern Link, Madresfield, Barnards Green, Cradley, West Malvern, Hanley Swan, Colwall and Suckley.

League and Cup games are played on Thursday evenings, over a 42-week period beginning in September running through to the following June. With over 400 members from 31 teams who meet with their friends and teammates to play skittles; this makes Thursday night one of the busiest in the Malvern area's pubs and clubs.

Each team consists of 9 players (although teams can sign as many players as they wish), league matches consist of 5 'legs' (each player bowling 3 balls), the winning team of each 'leg' gaining one point. The team scoring most 'pins' overall is also awarded 6 points. League matches are enhanced with team (Ken Baker Cup), 4 a side, doubles and singles cup competitions all played on Thursday evenings.

Evesham Skittles League
The league was formed in the early 1970s and is based around the Vale of Evesham and surrounding districts. It is played mostly in Public Houses, Working Men's Clubs, British Legion Clubs, Social and Recreational Clubs within a 12 - 15 mile radius of Evesham in Worcestershire. The league consisted of six divisions with a total of 72 teams competing These teams play from Monday to Thursday during the season, which stretches from early September through to late May. Teams included both men and women.

The League stipulates that the front pin facing the player should always be marked and is known as the 'King' pin. The two pins next to the 'King' pin are also marked and these are known as the 'Quarter' pins All the alleys within the Evesham League are wood and are based upon general guidelines in terms of length and width.

Each Team consists of 10 Players, each player playing six legs consisting of 3 balls per leg. The game consists of 6 legs for each team, each player bowling once(3 balls) per leg. Points are awarded on the basis of each leg won, plus a further 6 points for an overall win, making a full six leg win 12 Points. Many years ago the League introduced a system of play, whereby each player bowls alternatively against a player of the opposing team for each leg. This proved to be a successful format creating tension and excitement down to the last leg - last man.

Other counties in England

The game is also very common in the southwest counties of Cornwall, Devon, and Dorset. In Dorset some games are played by bowling a technique known as the 'Dorset flop', it is mainly used by those without proper technique. This is where the bowler crouches on the alley and throws themselves and the ball forward landing on their stomach and letting the ball go between two bowling lines. In some parts of Somerset the ball has to hit a pitch plate (a diamond painted on the alley) in order for it to be a legal ball. It is also popular in South Wales.

South Wales
In the Cardiff and District skittles league the teams are made up of 12 players playing 5 legs of three balls. The league was founded in 1909 and is still very popular in the region with 10 men's divisions. Other leagues within the Cardiff area are The Cardiff Combined clubs league with 9 men's and 9 women's divisions, Skittles Cardiff (a recent addition formed in 2010) and the Whitchurch and district skittles league

In the Newport and District skittle league (started ), Men-only teams are made up of 12 players playing in groups of four v four (three sections) each playing 3 legs of 3 balls, the league did have 7 men's divisions of up to 15 teams but now down to 4 divisions, Premier, 1st, 2nd and 3rd (2016/17).

In the 2012/13 season, the scoring changed from 2 points for a win and 1 point for a draw to 1 point for each leg and 2 points for the game. If the leg are drawn no points are awarded; however, if the game is drawn the a point is awarded to both sides.

There is a Ladies league that is played on a Tuesday.

They also play in the summer (started ) a mixed league. This has 3 divisions (2017), playing for 2 points a leg and 3 points for the game. There are cups to play for which are 8-a-side and also singles, pairs and fours. In 2016, Divisions 1, 2 & 3 were won by Dean Street, Windsor A and The Nightingale respectively.

In the Conservative league (Men only), the scoring is slightly different, with 1 point for each leg and 2 points for the game. However, points are shared between both sides for a draw for the legs and the game.

France
It is popular only in the southwest of the country. It is an indoor game which is played on a hard-packed surface. There is also an eight-pin version, and a version played with a mallet, which is related to ground billiards and its variants such as croquet and paille-maille, and which has experienced a resurgence in Gascony since 1973.

Ireland
The Irish sport is a game played with five  pins and three  pieces of wood (skittles). Pins are numbered from 1 to 5, each representing a number of points. Points are recorded in descending order. If a player should score too many points ("go bust", as in darts) they return to a score of 9 left, unless their previous score was above this in which case they return to that score.

The game is played frequently in pubs and Gaelic athletic clubs in various parts of the island with team leagues and cup matches.

Germany, Central Europe and the United States

The German sport kegel or nine-pin bowling is played in widely organized leagues through the country and is also popular in many other countries with long German connections, including Austria, Switzerland, Serbia, Slovenia, Croatia, Hungary and Liechtenstein and is currently gaining popularity in Australia. A variant was once also the dominant bowling game in the United States, but today only survives in a small area of rural Texas.

Glossary
 Anchor Man: the last player to throw in each leg. Likely chosen for their ability to score highly under pressure.
 Any Old How: a ball that has missed its intended target, but has knocked over quite a few pins that count towards the score.
 Backboard: a small optional plank behind the player and/or playing mat- some players like to rest their heels on it during play.
 Back-Stabber (Gloucestershire): a ball that knocks over the back pin only.  Known as a “Taylor” in the Westbury league.
 Ball: the wooden or rubber ball rolled at the skittles.
 Beaver: when a player knocks down no pins in a hand.
 Birdie: Worcestershire term for the pin in the centre of the frame, immediately behind the front pin. Also known as "bird in the cage" or the "Landlord".
 Bobby: Also known as the front or king pin.
 Bolter (South Wales): a ball that fails to hit any pin.
 Broken frame: a frame with some pins knocked over.
 Cheese: a round, flattened wooden discus (often made of lignum vitae), shaped like some types of cheese, which in some variants of the game is thrown instead of rolling a ball. It may also be rolled, like the oblate ball used in the game of bowls. It is particular used in deck skittles.
 Chute: see Trough.
 Copper: the pin on the extreme left or right of the frame. In Worcestershire the term 'Copper' is an alternative name for the front pin or 'King' as it's also known.
 Cush: the rails on either side of the alley, usually made from timber. Some alleys have ditches/gutters instead (similar to ten pin bowling).
 Cush ball: a ball that is bowled and hits the cush. In most variants of the game the pins that are then knocked down are not counted in the players score (see also sidey)
 Cut: when the ball hits the side of a pin.
 Dam Busters: The Dam Busters March is hummed loudly in unison when a player accidentally bounces a ball down the alley.
 Ditch: an area behind the pins that has been dug into the floor. It catches the pins that are knocked down.
 Down: the scores for all players in one set during a single hand, combined, e.g. "we just got a 24 down"
 Duck: a player's score when he or she doesn't knock down any pins on their turn.  Used to be referred to as a Jon until October 2016 when it was renamed as a "Simon".
 Fat Annie: Bristol and Somerset term for the middle pin, as in Birdie above.
 Flattener: same as strike, flopper or floorer (q.v.).
 Flopper: when a player knocks down all nine pins with one ball or cheese.
 Flopper ball: the ball that achieves a flopper
 Floorer (South Wales): same as strike
 Foul: a ball delivered illegally over the foul line
 Frame: the full set of pins (usually nine) standing upright.
 Front-for-one (Bristol): Where the front pin is struck without felling anything else with a single ball.
 Good strike: Denotes when after the first ball the remaining Pins stood up are able to be knocked down with the second ball for a spare.
 Hand: a player's turn at the game
 Hill gap: The Gap between the front pin and the front quarter pin, known as Ian and Darren respectively.
 King pin (Worcestershire): The pin at the front of the frame. Also name of type of skittles where front pin has to be floored before any pins count
 Landlord: the pin in the centre of the frame, immediately behind the front pin. Also known as "bird in the cage".
 Line: the mark on the alley that denotes where the ball must be delivered (before the line in Worcestershire, in-between two lines in Bristol etc.)
 Linesman: A member of the opposing side tasked with watching the Line for foul balls
 Long Three: three pins that are situated in a straight line when they are the only pins left standing and the player is trying to hit them down.
 Leg: known as a set elsewhere comprising 6, 8, 9, 10 or 12 players. In Gloucestershire, the name for a "down" (q.v.)
 No Ball: same as foul.
 Old Market (Bristol): Where the three front, middle and back pins are all felled by a single ball. Considered bad luck as it offers a poor remaining frame.
 One ball skittler (Bristol, Worcestershire): Where a player uses only one ball to good effect. Frowned on by purists.
 Over: same as foul.
 Oxo: same as Beaver.
 Pin: a skittle.
 Pit: same as Ditch.
 Pitch: the long rectangular strip along which balls are thrown and at the end of which the pins stand
 Plate: the strip on the floor which the balls have to hit when they leave the skittlers' hands. In Worcestershire, Bristol and North Somerset the plate is the square which the pins are stood on.
 Punch: when the ball hits the pin dead centre and ploughs through afterwards knocking down the pin behind but not the pins either side.
 Quarter: the two pins to either side and behind the front pin
 Quarter slasher: a player who seems to score well despite always hitting the quarter pin, rather than the front pin.
 Red Arrows: Front pin and the next two skittles left and right of it plus the third pin behind the front pin
 Running three: three pins running diagonally left to right or right to left.
 Set: three or four players who play against the opposing teams set
 Sidey: a ball played that hits the side of the alley.
 Skittle alley: a long narrow building in which skittles is usually played.
 Skittle the noise made when the skittles fall.
 Skittler's Nine (Worcestershire, North Somerset, and Gloucestershire): a nine achieved where a spare has not been possible, i.e. when the front pin has punched the middle and the back pin out.
 Spare: when a player knocks down all nine pins with 2 balls, allowing a third throw with the pins re-set.
 Split: The pins left after the first ball has been played.
 Spider (Worcestershire): when a player fails to knocks down any pins in a hand with his or her three balls.
 Spot: The marks on the plate which the pins are placed.
 Sticker or sticker-up: a person who puts knocked-over pins back upright.
 Strike: hitting over all the pins within one turn.
 Sunshine (New South Wales): same as spider
 Trough: a feature on most skittle alleys (constructed out of wood or plastic with a slope)that is used by the sticker-up to return the balls to the players end of the alley for the next go.
 V/c: used to denote a beaver or sunshine when chalking, also an alternative for those names in North Somerset—said to stand for "very close"
 Wide A ball that misses the diamond on either side, Also called a Steve or a Jake
 Winger (Worcestershire): Either of the two pins at the extreme right and left of the frame.
 Wraxall 8 (North Somerset): used to denote when a player scores 8 with the front pin still standing

Table skittles

Table-top versions of the game also exist. These include:
 Hood skittles: a miniaturized version in which the pins are on a special table which is closed on three sides with a leather hood; a 'cheese' is thrown at the pins underarm
 Devil among the tailors: another miniaturized version, in which a small ball is attached by a chain or string to a vertical pole, allowing it to be swung through the air in an arc to strike the pins.  This game is seen in the British television period drama series Downton Abbey in episode 2.3.  The game is seen being played in the library scene before dinner.  A 10-pin version of this game was produced by Aurora Plastics and was sold in America under the name "Skittle Bowl" (©1969).  The game is also seen in the Beatles film "A Hard Days Night." Ringo leaves his pot of beer on the table of the game and when the ball comes around the glass is smashed. The owner then throws all of the Beatles out of the pub.

Scattles and smite

Scattles is a version of skittles in which all the pins are numbered. Players take turn in throwing the baton at the pins with a view to totalling exactly 50 points. If more than one pin is knocked over, the score received is that quantity of pins. But if only one pin is knocked over, the value on it is scored. If a player exceeds 50, their total reduces to 25. Pins are then placed upright where they stand, thus scattering. Scattles is made by Jaques of London and reminiscent of the older Cornish game, smite, itself based on the Finnish skittles game mölkky.

Cultural references
The phrase "beer and skittles" refers to indulgently spending one's time at a pub, drinking and playing the game, and by extension any indulgent, irresponsible lifestyle choice.

A table-top version of the game is also featured in the first season of the Netflix series Easy, specifically episode seven.

In an episode of Malcolm in the Middle; specifically, season 2, episode 8, Dewey is a natural, according to Hal, and asks Dewey if he wants to be the next Chap Sanders.

References

External links

 International Federation of Bowlers (FIQ, Fédération Internationale des Quilleurs)
 The Geordies Skittles Team in association with the Bristol Association of Skittles Statisticians (Follow the links to Science, including the dynamics of a skittles ball and statistical analysis of individual performance.)
 Wellington (Somerset) Mens Skittles League
 Cardiff, Wales Mixed ladies and gentlemen teams
 Skittles Computer-Game for multiple platforms (FM EDV, Skittles Computer-Game for multiple platforms)

Bowling
Pub games
Lawn games